Shrek (27 November 1994 – 6 June 2011) was a Merino wether (castrated male sheep) belonging to Bendigo Station, a sheep station near Tarras, New Zealand, who gained international fame in 2004, after he avoided being caught and shorn for six years. Merinos are normally shorn annually, but Shrek apparently hid in caves, avoiding muster. He was named after the fictional ogre in books and films of the same name.

After finally being caught on 15 April 2004, the wether was shorn by a professional in 20 minutes on 28 April. The shearing was broadcast on national television in New Zealand. His fleece contained enough wool to make 20 large men's suits, weighing 27 kg (60 lb) – an average Merino fleece weighs around 4.5 kg (10 lb), with exceptional weights up to around 15 kg (33 lb).

Shrek became a national icon. He was taken to parliament to meet the then-New Zealand Prime Minister, Helen Clark, in May 2004, to celebrate his 10th birthday. In November 2006, 30 months after his initial shearing, Shrek was shorn again, on an iceberg floating off the coast of Dunedin, New Zealand.

Shrek was euthanised on 6 June 2011 on a veterinarian's advice. He was 16.

See also
Agriculture in New Zealand
Chris – a similar case in Australia
Sonny Wool – tongue-in-cheek "psychic sheep" that became popular during the 2011 Rugby World Cup.

References

1994 animal births
2011 animal deaths
Individual sheep
New Zealand culture
Sheep farming in New Zealand
Individual animals in New Zealand
Animal deaths by euthanasia
Animal mascots